A number of steamships have been named Kleinella, including:

, a British tanker in service 1948–53
, a British tanker in service 1946–48

Ship names